Vladimir Valeryevich Osechkin (born 14 June 1981, Samara) is a Russian human rights activist who operates the anti-corruption website Gulagu.net. He had been placed on a wanted list by Russian state after leaking a large archive of documents, photos and videos with hundreds cases of rape and torture of inmates in Russian prisons directed by prison officials. The archive was collected by whistleblower Sergei Saveliev. Osechkin also used a number of other sources in Russian prisons and the FSB. Osechkin has lived in Paris since 2015. 

In August 2022, Osechkin urged former Russian soldier and dissident Pavel Filatyev to flee the country with the help of Gulagu.net, which Filatyev did on 13 August 2022.

References

External links
 gulagu.net (No to Gulag) 

1981 births
Living people
Russian activists against the 2022 Russian invasion of Ukraine
Russian emigrants to France
Russian human rights activists
Torture in Russia